Moorside railway station is a railway station serving the town of Swinton, Greater Manchester, England. The station stands on Moorside Road, close to the junction with Chorley Road (A6).

It was opened in 1888 (along with the line) and, like others on the route, has a single island platform serving the two lines that pass through.  When the line was quadrupled at the beginning of the 20th century, the two extra lines were laid to the south of the existing ones and were not given platforms.  They were subsequently decommissioned in November 1965 and removed.

Until 6 May 1974, it was named Moorside & Wardley, becoming Moorside on that date.

Moorside is the least used station on the Atherton Line.

On 17 February 2020, the entrance and ticket office were destroyed by a fire. Police believed the fire was started deliberately.

The blaze took place weeks after the station had been refurbished. Prior to the renovation, the station had been regarded as one of the worst on the rail network, with outdated facilities.

Facilities
The station has a ticket office at street level, which is staffed part-time (06:55 - 12:55, weekdays only).  Outside these times, tickets must be purchased on the train or prior to travel. Timetable posters offer train running information. Unlike most stations, there are no digital display screens. No step-free access is available, as the only means of getting from the entrance and ticket hall to the platform is via a staircase.

Service

Additional trains call during the weekday peak periods.

Evenings there is an hourly service in each direction to Manchester Victoria and Wigan.

There is now an hourly service in each direction on Sundays, to Southport and Blackburn via Manchester Victoria and the Caldervale Line.

References

External links

Railway stations in Salford
DfT Category E stations
Former Lancashire and Yorkshire Railway stations
Northern franchise railway stations
Railway stations in Great Britain opened in 1888